The inland Kimberley slider (Lerista borealis)  is a species of skink found in Western Australia and the Northern Territory.

References

Lerista
Reptiles described in 1971
Taxa named by Glen Milton Storr